Judith Ann Mayotte (born January 25, 1937) is an American humanitarian, author, theologian, producer, former Catholic religious sister, ethicist, and university professor.

Early life

She was born Judith Ann Moberly in Wichita, Kansas, where she grew up in the typical midwest household.  During her first year in college she was stricken with polio. She then had to literally learn how to walk all over again. She soon turned to Catholicism and, against her father's wishes, became a religious sister.

Sister of Charity
For 10 years Moberly lived as a member of the Sisters of Charity of the Blessed Virgin Mary, during which time she was known as Sister Mary Vivia, B.V.M. This being a teaching order, she worked in the inner cities of Los Angeles, Phoenix, Arizona, Milwaukee and Kansas City, Missouri. "That was my introduction to people on the margins of society," she says.

The changes in the way of life of members of Catholic religious orders mandated by Second Vatican Council held by the Catholic Church during the mid-1960s led Moberly to reassess her life, and she eventually left her religious congregation. She then taught juvenile delinquents for a while, and in 1976 earned a doctorate in theology at Marquette University.

Moberly soon married Jack Mayotte who was International Vice President for Square D.  They were together only three years before he died of cancer in 1975.

Television producer

Mayotte then spent time as a television producer. In 1978 she joined WTTW, Chicago's public broadcasting station, as the Director of Research for the News and Current Affairs Division. In 1982 she joined Turner Broadcasting as Senior Researcher and a producer for the Emmy and Peabody Award winning documentary series Portrait of America. In 1985 she won an Emmy for writing and producing the "Washington" segment of the series. In 1986 she joined the William Benton Fellowships in Broadcast Journalism at the University of Chicago as associate director and in 1988 became acting director.

It was during this time that Mayotte found herself drawn, inexplicably, she says, to refugee work. She simply realized one day that she wanted to venture overseas and work with the displaced: "It's something I can't really explain. It was just in my heart and my gut. I just didn't question it."

Finding her passion

Mayotte applied for and received a grant from the MacArthur Foundation to write a book about refugees. In 1989, at age 51, she embarked on two years of living alone in Eritrea, Sudan, Pakistan, Thailand, and Cambodia. Her book, Disposable People? The Plight of Refugees, was published in 1992.

According to an article in the April 1997 issue of Johns Hopkins Magazine, in September 1993 Mayotte traveled to southern Sudan (now the independent nation of South Sudan) on behalf of Refugees International. She was gathering information on Operation Lifeline Sudan, whose 27 organizations, including UNICEF, were trying to feed 1.5 million people a day, all of them refugees created by Sudan's three-decade civil war. In tow was a film crew from a public television series, Visionaries. While in a village named Ayod, the crew decided to film an aerial supply drop. The article describes the event:

State Department career

In 1994 Mayotte was appointed by the first Clinton Administration to the U.S. Department of State, Bureau of Population, Refugees, and Migration as a Special Adviser on refugee issues and policy. Before joining the State Department, she was Chairwoman of the Women's Refugee Commission, and served on the board of Refugees International. She was a member of the executive committee of the International Rescue Committee's board, one of the largest non-sectarian private voluntary organizations in the United States, and a Senior Fellow of the Refugee Policy Group of Washington, D.C.

Mayotte has written extensive reports, articles and editorial pieces, appeared on radio and television, and lectures on refugee and development issues. She has been called to testify as an expert witness before congressional committees concerned with the status of refugees and the direction of U.S. policy regarding the issue, and she has briefed officials of the United States government and United Nations.

Academia
Mayotte then entered into academia.  She taught on the faculty of Seattle University and in Johns Hopkins University's Paul H. Nitze School of Advanced International Studies. She later went on to be a professor in the Department of Theology at Marquette and was the Women's Chair in Humanistic Studies, during which time she helped to found the South Africa Service Learning Program in that nation. In 1994 for her work among refugees, Mayotte received Refugee Voices annual Mickey Leland Award and Refugees International's 1994 Award. In 1995 Mayotte received the Marymount Manhattan College Humanitarian Award and Georgetown University's Learning, Faith, and Freedom Medal. She served as a member of the June 1996 Foreign Policy faculty of the Salzburg Seminar and she was featured in one segment of the thirteen-part PBS television series and book, Visionaries, in her role of refugee advocate for Refugees International.

Mayotte currently serves on the Desmond Tutu Peace Foundation Board and Operating Committee, in connection with the Desmond Tutu Peace Centre and Leadership Academy in Cape Town, South Africa. She also serves on the board of the Visionaries Institute of Suffolk University in Massachusetts. She currently resides in Cape Town and is focusing on developing educational curriculum on peace and leadership.

Mayotte is the 2009 recipient of the Nuclear Age Peace Foundation's World Citizenship Award. Mayotte was named the first Desmond Tutu Distinguished Chair in Global Understanding for the Semester at Sea in 2010.

Mayotte moderated a Google Hangout between the Dalai Lama and Archbishop Desmond Tutu on October 8, 2011.

Quotes 
I have walked in so many war zones and so many refugee situations. I hope never again to see someone freshly blown up by a land mine. What I have seen ... there has to be a way for that not to happen.

Bibliography

Notes

External links
 Sisters of Charity of the Blessed Virgin Mary
 The Desmond Tutu Peace Centre
 Global Ethics and Religion Forum
 

1937 births
Writers from Wichita, Kansas
People with polio
Converts to Roman Catholicism
20th-century American Roman Catholic nuns
Former Roman Catholic religious sisters and nuns
Marquette University alumni
20th-century American Roman Catholic theologians
Women Christian theologians
21st-century American Roman Catholic theologians
Seattle University faculty
Marquette University faculty
Johns Hopkins University faculty
American humanitarians
Women humanitarians
Peabody Award winners
News & Documentary Emmy Award winners
Living people
American amputees
American expatriates in South Africa
Catholics from Kansas
United States Department of State officials
American women academics
21st-century American Roman Catholic nuns